Donald Frederick Harker (born 1945) was the seventh Bishop of George.

He was born in 1945 and educated at St Peter's, Alice and ordained in 1969. He began his career with a curacy at All Saints Mossel Bay before becoming the incumbent at Beaufort West. He ascended to the episcopate in 1999 and resigned his see in 2010.

References

University of South Africa alumni
21st-century Anglican Church of Southern Africa bishops
Anglican bishops of George
Living people
1945 births